David Korn or Corn may refer to:
David G. Korn (born 1943), American computer scientist
David A. Korn (born 1930), former United States Ambassador to Togo
David Corn (born 1959), American political journalist and author